A List of sofers, (or the female soferet).

Alphabetic list

See also
List of Jews in religion

Sofers